Gregor Bruce MacKellar (born July 22, 1998) is a professional Canadian football offensive lineman for the Toronto Argonauts of the Canadian Football League (CFL).

University career
MacKellar first attended Rice University in 2017 and had a redshirt season while a member of the Rice Owls. Following a coaching change, MacKellar sought a transfer and moved back to Nova Scotia to become a member of the St. Francis Xavier X-Men in time for the 2018 season. In his first season, the X-Men were Loney Bowl champions after defeating the Saint Mary's Huskies. He did not play in 2020 due to the cancellation of the 2020 U Sports football season. In his fourth and final year, in 2021, he was named a U Sports Second Team All-Canadian and again won the Loney Bowl in a victory over the Bishop's Gaiters.

Professional career
MacKellar was ranked as the 19th best player in the Canadian Football League's Amateur Scouting Bureau final rankings for players eligible in the 2022 CFL Draft. He was then drafted in the first round, sixth overall, in the draft by the Toronto Argonauts. He then signed with the team on May 10, 2022. Following training camp, he was placed on the injured list, but soon after played in his first career professional game on July 4, 2022, against the Winnipeg Blue Bombers. His first game played outside of Toronto's BMO Field was in Wolfville, Nova Scotia as part of Touchdown Atlantic where he dressed as a backup offensive lineman in his home province.

Personal life
MacKellar was born to parents Bruce and Kelly MacKellar. He has one sister, Ainsley, who also attended St. Francis Xavier University. MacKellar plays bagpipes and competed in 2013 World Pipe Band Championships in Glasgow, Scotland.

References

External links
Toronto Argonauts bio 

1998 births
Living people
Canadian football offensive linemen
St. Francis Xavier X-Men football players
Players of Canadian football from Nova Scotia
People from the Halifax Regional Municipality
Toronto Argonauts players